Radium fluoride is an inorganic compound with a chemical formula of . This salt, like all radium compounds is highly radioactive. It can be coprecipitated with lanthanide fluorides. Radium fluoride has the same crystal form as calcium fluoride (fluorite).

Production
Radium fluoride can be produced by the reaction of radium metal and hydrogen fluoride gas:

References

See also
 

Radium compounds
Fluorides
Alkaline earth metal halides